Ferdinandus Hubertus Hamer C.I.C.M. (born 21 August 1840 in Nijmegen, Netherlands, died 23 July 1900 in To Tsjeng, Inner Mongolia, China) was a Catholic missionary to China and bishop who was killed in the Boxer Rebellion in China.

Biography
Father Ferdinand Hamer was one of the first group of five missionary priests and brother from the congregation of Congregatio Immaculati Cordis Mariae who went to Inner Mongolia in China from Belgium in 1865. His three colleagues, among them the congregation's leader, Father Theophiel Verbist, died quickly, and then Father Hamer was left to return alone, although he had some lay workers to help him. 

Later, he became better with the language and the missionary work. In 1878, he was the first bishop to have responsibility for the apostolic vicariate of Gansu. In 1889 he was sent by the Pope to the apostolic vicariate of Southwest-Mongolia. Although he had problems again with language, the Chinese noted his extraordinary helpfulness and devotion. 

In 1899, he was caught up in the anti-Christian Boxer Rebellion. In July and August 1900 the Boxers reached the area where Bishop Hamer was working. The Boxers took him to jail on 19 July, and four days later they subjected him to beatings, mockery, questioning, and torture. His nose, fingers and ears were cut off and all of his hair pulled out.  That same day, 23 July, he was killed; three sticks were put together into a tripod, and an iron hook was placed at the top. The bishop was stripped and wrapped in a cotton cloth, and dunked in oil. He was then hanged by his feet from the hook with his head hanging down. The cloth was then set on fire. A loud scream was heard, and he died.

See also

References
Biografisch Woordenboek van Nederland – Biography
Harry Knipschild: Soldaten van God; Nederlandse en Belgische priesters op missie in China in de negentiende eeuw, uitgeverij Bert Bakker, 2007, paperback, 312 p. 
Harry Knipschild: Ferdinand Hamer, 1840–1900, Missiepionier en martelaar in China, Universiteit Leiden, 2005

1840 births
1900 deaths
People from Nijmegen
People of the Boxer Rebellion
Dutch Roman Catholic missionaries
Roman Catholic missionaries in China
19th-century Roman Catholic bishops in China
Dutch sinologists
Dutch people murdered abroad
People murdered in China
Dutch people who died in prison custody
Prisoners who died in Chinese detention
Dutch expatriates in China
Missionary linguists